Rajini may refer to:

soothiya (name), see Rajani (name)
Rajini School, a school in Thailand
Rajinikanth, Indian film actor
Rajini (TV series), 2021 television series in Zee tamil

See also
 Rajani